Socialist Alternative can refer to any of several left-wing politics political organizations, many affiliated to the International Socialist Alternative or Reunified Fourth International.

See also
Alternativa Socialista Revolucionaria, Bolivian section of the CWI
New Socialist Alternative, Indian section of the CWI
Socialistická alternativa Budoucnost, Czech section of the CWI
Socialistische Partij Anders, the Belgian Flemish social-democratic party
Socialist Voice (New Zealand), previously known as Socialist Alternative
Socialist Alternatives, a defunct political magazine linked with the International Revolutionary Marxist Tendency

Political party disambiguation pages